The 1984 Peach Bowl featured the Purdue Boilermakers of the Big Ten against the Virginia Cavaliers of the ACC. Virginia defeated Purdue 27–24 in the first bowl game in school history.

Purdue jumped out to a 24–14 halftime lead, but Virginia scored the only points of the second half with a touchdown and two field goals in order to pull out the win. Purdue quarterback Jim Everett passed for 253 yards and three touchdowns, but the Boilermakers gained just 75 yards rushing and committed four turnovers in their first bowl loss. Purdue finished the season 7–5 and tied for second place in the Big Ten. Virginia finished 8–2–2.

References

Peach Bowl
Peach Bowl
Purdue Boilermakers football bowl games
Virginia Cavaliers football bowl games
December 1984 sports events in the United States
1984 in sports in Georgia (U.S. state)